Saddam Yaser Ba-Matraf (born April 1, 1993) is a Yemeni Taekwondo practitioner.   He won the silver medal in the men's bantamweight (under 63 kg) category at the 2012 Asian Taekwondo Championships.

References

External links
 
 2011 Yaser Ba-Matraf at 2011 Arab Games (official site)

1993 births
Living people
Yemeni male taekwondo practitioners
Taekwondo practitioners at the 2010 Asian Games
Taekwondo practitioners at the 2014 Asian Games
Asian Games competitors for Yemen
Asian Taekwondo Championships medalists